Rickinghall is a village in the Mid Suffolk district of Suffolk, England.  The village is split between two parishes, Rickinghall Inferior and Rickinghall Superior, which join with Botesdale to make a single built-up area.

There used to be many pubs, but now only The Bell Inn and The Greyhound (Botesdale) remain.  The White Horse was converted to private accommodation in November 2016.

Rickinghall was the birthplace of Sir Mackenzie Bowell, Prime Minister of Canada from 1894 to 1896, as well as the life-long home of Basil Brown, the amateur archaeologist who was instrumental in discovering and excavating the Sutton Hoo Anglo Saxon Ship Burial and associated treasure in 1939.

The adjoining village of Botesdale has one school, St Botolph's CEVCP, which serves Rickinghall, Botesdale, Redgrave and other local villages. Children from this school generally attend the Hartismere High School in Eye from the age of eleven. The Botesdale After School Club operates after school hours at Botesdale village hall which also houses the Botesdale and Rickinghall pre-school from 9.00 - 3.00.

The villages of Rickinghall and Botesdale are very well serviced with a Co-op local store, Chinese takeaway, fish and chip shop, estate agent and several hairdressers amongst others. The Post Office with News closed in autumn 2016.

References

External links

Diss Express - village's local newspaper website
 Rickinghall Parish Council website
 Parish Magazine web page
 St Mary's Church, Rickinghall Inferior web site
 Rickinghall Village Hall web site

Villages in Suffolk
Mid Suffolk District